Sophia of Saxe-Weissenfels (also: Sophie; 23 June 1654 in Halle an der Saale – 31 March 1724 in Zerbst) was a member of the Albertine branch of the House of Wettin, and a princess of  Saxe-Weissenfels and Querfurt by birth and by marriage Princess of Anhalt-Zerbst.

Family 
Sophia was the third daughter of the Duke August of Saxe-Weissenfels and his wife Anna Maria of Mecklenburg-Schwerin, daughter of Duke Adolf Frederick I of Mecklenburg-Schwerin.  She was named after her paternal great-grandmother, Sophie of Brandenburg, Electress of Saxony.

Marriage and issue 
She married on 18 June 1676 in Halle with her first cousin once removed Karl William, a son of her paternal first cousin Sophie Augusta of Holstein-Gottorp to her husband John VI, Prince of Anhalt-Zerbst.  Unlike most royal couples of the era, Charles William and Sophia shared a bedroom in their new baroque palace.  This suggests that they may have married out of love.

They had the following children:
 John Augustus (1677–1742), Prince of Anhalt-Zerbst
 Charles Augustus (born: July 2, 1678 in Zerbst, died: 1 September 1693 ibid), Prince of Anhalt-Zerbst
 Magdalena Augusta (1679–1740), Princess of Anhalt-Zerbst
 married Frederick II, Duke of Saxe-Gotha-Altenburg

Death and burial 
Sophia died at the age of 69 years in her rooms at Zerbst Castle and was buried on 7 June 1724 in the princely tomb in the St. Bartholomew's Church in Zerbst.  In 1899 Duke Duke Frederick I of Anhalt, ordered the implementation of a princely family vault in the Castle Church in Zerbst Castle.  After the destruction of the castle in 1945, the remains of the damaged coffins were transferred back to St. Bartholomew.

External Links and sources 
 
 Entry in ThePeerage.com
 Johann Hübner's ... Three hundred and thirty-three Genealogical Tables, Table 170
 Schloss-Zerbst.de

House of Saxe-Weissenfels
House of Wettin
1654 births
1724 deaths
German princesses
17th-century German people
18th-century German people
Albertine branch
Royal reburials
Daughters of monarchs